The 1962 Minnesota gubernatorial election was the closest statewide race in Minnesota history and one of the closest gubernatorial elections in U.S. history. The election was held on November 6, 1962, but the results were not known until March 21, 1963. The vote count after election day had Governor Elmer L. Andersen in the lead by 142 votes. Then-Lieutenant Governor Karl Rolvaag went to court and won the right to a recount. After the recount, it was determined that Rolvaag had defeated Andersen by 91 votes out of over 1.2 million cast. He received 619,842 votes to Andersen's 619,751.

At the time, governors and lieutenant governors were elected on separate ballots. Andersen was a Republican and Rolvaag a Democrat. The 1962 election was also the first four-year term election for Minnesota governor.

Results

See also
List of Minnesota gubernatorial elections

References

External links
 http://www.sos.state.mn.us/home/index.asp?page=653
 http://www.sos.state.mn.us/home/index.asp?page=657

Gubernatorial
1962
Minnesota
November 1962 events in the United States